Hippothoa is a genus of bryozoans belonging to the family Hippothoidae.

The genus has cosmopolitan distribution.

Species:

Hippothoa annularis
Hippothoa balanophila 
Hippothoa borealis 
Hippothoa brasiliensis 
Hippothoa calcicola 
Hippothoa calciophilia 
Hippothoa catophilia 
Hippothoa discreta
Hippothoa distans 
Hippothoa divaricata 
Hippothoa divaricata 
Hippothoa eburnea 
Hippothoa expansa 
Hippothoa flagellum 
Hippothoa fusiformis 
Hippothoa holostoma
Hippothoa imperforata 
Hippothoa longicauda 
Hippothoa longicauda 
Hippothoa mawatarii 
Hippothoa meridionalis 
Hippothoa minitumulosa 
Hippothoa muricata
Hippothoa muripinnata 
Hippothoa musivaria 
Hippothoa naredensis 
Hippothoa parvipora 
Hippothoa peristomata 
Hippothoa petrophila 
Hippothoa planula 
Hippothoa rudis 
Hippothoa rugulosa
Hippothoa santacruzana 
Hippothoa savignyana 
Hippothoa temnichorda 
Hippothoa tuberculata
Hippothoa watersi

References

Bryozoan genera